Trilussa - Storia d'amore e di poesia is a 2013 Italian television film directed by Lodovico Gasparini. It was broadcast in two parts on 11 and 12 March 2013 on Rai 1.

Plot 
This historical biographical TV series is based on the life of the Italian poet Trilussa.

Cast 
 Michele Placido as Trilussa
 Monica Guerritore as  Rosa
 Renato Scarpa as  Pio XI
 Valentina Corti as  Giselda
 Rodolfo Laganà as  Rapiselli
 Emanuele Bosi as  Arturo
 Stelvio Cipriani as Marcello

Location 
The series is filmed in Rome's most famous spots, such as:
 Palazzo Venezia
 Galleria Sciarra
 Villa Borghese
 Campidoglio
 Trastevere
 Palazzo Sacchetti
 Piazza Campitelli
 Piazza Costaguti
 Via dell'Arco dei Cenci

References

External links
 
 Official page on RAI
 Trilussa - Storia d'amore e di poesia on mymovies.it

Italian television films
2010s Italian-language films
2013 television films
2013 films
Films scored by Stelvio Cipriani
RAI original programming
Films directed by Lodovico Gasparini
2010s Italian films
Cultural depictions of Italian men
Cultural depictions of poets